Linthicum may refer to:

Linthicum, Maryland, United States, a census-designated place and an unincorporated community in Anne Arundel County
 Linthicum (Baltimore Light Rail station)
Linthicum (surname)